A Futile and Stupid Gesture is a 2018 American biographical comedy-drama film based on Josh Karp's book of the same title, directed by David Wain, and written by Michael Colton and John Aboud. The film stars Will Forte as comedy writer Douglas Kenney, during the rise and fall of National Lampoon. 

A Futile and Stupid Gesture had its world premiere at the 2018 Sundance Film Festival on January 24, 2018, and was released on January 26, 2018, by Netflix.

Plot
The film's timeline stretches from 1964 to 1980. The film opens with Douglas Kenney and his classmate Henry Beard celebrating the release of their book, Bored of the Rings, with the Harvard Lampoon staff.

They graduate from Harvard and Kenney convinces Beard not to go to law school but instead publish a monthly magazine: the National Lampoon. Though Kenney is the magazine's main creative voice, there would be no magazine without the guidance of Beard. Kenney becomes the comedy writer and Beard the business manager, while the magazine also has a thriving art department.

They get financing from Matty Simmons. All of the writers work hard to be funny and meet deadlines. Work is a party atmosphere and illicit drug use is prevalent. The magazine is not initially a success until lawsuits are threatened by Disney, Volkswagen, Mormons, and many other established names. The comedy world is changed, and the magazine pushes the acceptance of satire and parody with each edition.

Kenney, due to burnout, suddenly leaves for nine months with a one-line note to Beard. The magazine stays successful under Beard. After five years Simmons agrees to a buyout and they each collect $3.5 million, a request demanded by Beard and Kenney. Beard, being unhappy and greatly stressed, takes his check and immediately exits the magazine.

National Lampoon expands to an hour radio show attracting more great comedians like Chevy Chase, Bill Murray, and Gilda Radner. But Lorne Michaels buys them all out and signs them over to Saturday Night Live. Special editions of the magazine are published such as one mocking high school yearbooks.

Kenney then moves to movies and writes Animal House in 1978. With the success of the film, cocaine takes over Kenney's life. As disputes with studio executives continue, Kenney writes Caddyshack. Not liking his work, he embarrasses himself being drunk and high at a press conference for the film.

Kenney, Beard and Chris Hoffman all sell the National Lampoon to 21st Century Communications. Kenney's cocaine addiction takes over. Chevy Chase takes Kenney to Hawaii to beat the cocaine but cocaine wins instead. In 1980, at age 33, Kenney's body is found at the bottom of a Hawaiian cliff (with his glasses and shoes neatly stacked at the top edge). As he has narrated his life's story through the movie, Kenney is displeased to see everyone sad at his funeral. The movie ends with Beard starting a food fight at the wake (just like at the Harvard Lampoon years ago).

Cast

 Will Forte as Douglas Kenney
 Martin Mull as modern Douglas, the narrator
 Frank and Morgan Gingerich as young Douglas
 Domhnall Gleeson as Henry Beard
 Neil Casey as Brian McConnachie
 Jon Daly as Bill Murray
 Nelson Franklin as P.J. O'Rourke
 John Gemberling as John Belushi
 Rick Glassman as Harold Ramis
 Seth Green as Christopher Guest
 Max Greenfield as Chris Miller
 Harry Groener as Harry Kenney, Douglas' father
 Camille Guaty as Alex Garcia-Mata
 Ed Helms as Tom Snyder
 Thomas Lennon as Michael O'Donoghue
 Joe Lo Truglio as Brad Zotti
 Matt Lucas as Tony Hendra
 Natasha Lyonne as Anne Beatts
 Joel McHale as Chevy Chase 
 Annette O'Toole as Stephanie Kenney, Douglas' mother
 Emmy Rossum as Kathryn Walker
 Jackie Tohn as Gilda Radner
 Matt Walsh as Matty Simmons
 Finn Wittrock as Tim Matheson
 Elvy Yost as Mary Marshmallow
 David Wain as Interviewer
 Ben Campbell as Harvard Jester
 Jon Klaft as Preppy Student
 Brad Morris as Peter Ivers
 Rick Overton as First Publisher
 Mark Metcalf as Second Publisher
 David Krumholtz & Mitch Hurwitz as Time-Life Publishers
 Michael Sherman as Ed Sullivan
 Kerri Kenney-Silver as Sullivan Producer
 Bob Stephenson as Construction Worker
 Liz Femi as Skeptical Black Woman
 Chris Redd as Skeptical Black Man
 Meera Rohit Kumbhani as Elaine
 Armen Weitzman as Lorne Michaels
 Lonny Ross as Ivan Reitman
 Steven Sims as Stephen Furst
 Brian Huskey as John Landis
 Rich Sommer as Harry Crane
 Carla Gallo as Lucy Fisher
 Andrew Gray McDonnell as Michael O'Keefe
 Erv Dahl as Rodney Dangerfield
 Paul Scheer as Paul Shaffer
 Lindsey Kraft as Gwyneth Cravens

A photo of Paul Rudd, who has appeared in many of Wain's projects, was used as Larry Kroger.

Production
Principal photography began in Los Angeles, California on April 14, 2016.

Release 

A single trailer was released on December 20, 2017. The film had its world premiere at the 2018 Sundance Film Festival on January 24, and was then released on Netflix on January 26, 2018.

Reception
The site's consensus reads, "A Futile and Stupid Gesture entertainingly recreates the birth of an influential comedic movement, even if it struggles to cover its creative ground." On Metacritic, the film has a score of 55 out of 100, based on 15 critics, indicating "mixed or average reviews".

Writing for TheWrap, Todd Gilchrist opined, "Even if the casting choices in portraying some of iconic talents in Kenney's orbit are occasionally questionable a detail the film gleefully acknowledges there's something delightful about watching actors known for comedy now try to capture the sound or energy of the performers who inspired them." Ellin Stein of Slate stated, "There's a sense that the filmmakers have bitten off more than they can chew by trying to cram both the biography and the panoramic overview into one feature."

References

External links
 

2010s biographical films
2018 comedy-drama films
National Lampoon (franchise)
American comedy-drama films
American biographical films
English-language Netflix original films
Films directed by David Wain
Films based on non-fiction books
2018 independent films
2010s English-language films
2010s American films
Films shot in Los Angeles